This article is a list of the top 50 accounts with most followers on the photo and video-sharing social platform Instagram. The most followed account on the platform is Instagram's own brand account. The most followed individual is Portuguese footballer Cristiano Ronaldo.

Most-followed accounts
The following table lists the 50 most-followed accounts on Instagram, with each total rounded down to the nearest million followers, as well as the profession or activity of each user.

See also

 List of most-liked Instagram posts
 List of most-followed Facebook pages
 List of most-followed Twitter accounts
 List of most-followed TikTok accounts
 List of most-subscribed YouTube channels
 List of most-viewed YouTube videos
 List of most-subscribed YouTube Music artists
 List of most-streamed artists on Spotify
 List of most-streamed songs on Spotify
 List of most-followed Twitch channels

References

Lists of Internet-related superlatives
Instagram-related lists
Instagram